Lorraine Toussaint ( born April 4, 1960) is a Trinidadian-American actress. She is the recipient of various accolades, including a Black Reel Award, a Critics' Choice Television Award and a Screen Actors Guild Award.

Toussaint began her career in theatre before supporting performances in films such as Breaking In (1989), Hudson Hawk (1991), and Dangerous Minds (1995). As lead actress, she is best known for her role as Rene Jackson in the critically acclaimed Lifetime television drama series Any Day Now, from 1998 to 2002, and her recurring role as defense attorney Shambala Green in the NBC legal drama Law & Order. She later appeared as a regular cast member in the NBC police procedural Crossing Jordan (2002–03) and the TNT crime drama Saving Grace (2007–10).

Toussaint received critical acclaim and an Independent Spirit Award nomination for her performance in the 2012 drama film Middle of Nowhere, written and directed by Ava DuVernay. In 2014, she played the role of Yvonne "Vee" Parker, the main antagonist in the second season of the Netflix comedy-drama series Orange Is the New Black, for which she received critical acclaim and a Critics' Choice Television Award for Best Supporting Actress in a Drama Series. She also played the role of Amelia Boynton Robinson in the 2014 historical drama film Selma, directed by Ava DuVernay. Toussaint later co-starred in the ABC fantasy-drama series Forever (2014–15), the Fox comedy-drama Rosewood (2015–17), the AMC drama Into the Badlands (2018–19), NBC drama The Village (2019) and CBS crime drama The Equalizer (2021-present). Additionally, she appeared in films Fast Color (2018), Scary Stories to Tell in the Dark (2019), The Glorias (2020) and Concrete Cowboy (2020).

Early life 
Toussaint was born in Trinidad and Tobago. In an interview she said: "I grew up under the British system, which I think is horrific for children -- very, very strict -- a system that did not recognize children as being individuals. You were small animals earning the right to be human. Childhood for me then felt extraordinarily powerless, and as an artistic child who learned in alternative ways, it was hell. I was beaten regularly... A good child was a fearful child, and I was a very, very, good little girl, which meant I lived in a world of silent, dark terror most of the time." Her mother was a teacher, and brought Toussaint to live in Brooklyn in the late 1960s.

Toussaint graduated from Manhattan's High School of Performing Arts in 1978. She then attended the Juilliard School's drama division as a member of Group 11 (1978–1982), where her classmates in 1982 included Megan Gallagher, Penny Johnson Jerald, Jack Kenny, and Jack Stehlin. Toussaint graduated from Juilliard with a Bachelor of Fine Arts degree. She then began her career as a Shakespearean actress before tackling screen acting in television and film. Notable stage roles include Hippolyta in Liviu Ciulei's production of A Midsummer Night's Dream at the Guthrie Theater, Tamara in the world premiere of Toni Morrison's Dreaming Emmett at Capital Repertory Theatre, the American premiere of Two Fish in the Sky at the Phoenix Theatre, and an appearance at Tadashi Suzuki's Toga Festival in Japan.

Career

Early career 
Toussaint made her screen debut in 1983. In 1986, she portrayed the widow of a man shot and killed by Boston police in the television film A Case of Deadly Force, based on the book by Lawrence O'Donnell. She later had a recurring role of Vera Williams in the ABC daytime soap opera, One Life to Live. While maintaining her stage career, she appeared in guest starring roles in series such as 227 and Law & Order (in a recurring role as defense lawyer Shambala Green). She also acted in a number of television films in the 1990s.

Toussaint made her film debut in the female lead role opposite Burt Reynolds in the crime comedy Breaking In (1989). The film received positive reviews from critics, but flopped in box office. In 1991, she appeared opposite Bruce Willis in Hudson Hawk, and later co-starred alongside Michelle Pfeiffer in Dangerous Minds (1995). She also appeared in films Point of No Return (1993), Mother's Boys (1994), and Black Dog (1998). On television, Toussaint had regular roles in short-lived series Bodies of Evidence (CBS, 1992), Where I Live (ABC, 1993), Amazing Grace (NBC, 1995), and Leaving L.A. (ABC, 1997).

1998–2011 
Toussaint had her biggest and leading role alongside Annie Potts in the Lifetime first original television drama series, Any Day Now, starring as Rene Jackson, a successful African-American lawyer. The series received critical acclaim for both lead actresses' performances as well as the show's script writing but never attained standout ratings. In 2001, Toussaint was a promising contender for a Primetime Emmy Award for Outstanding Lead Actress in a Drama Series category, though she did not receive a nomination. She was nominated five times for a NAACP Image Award for Outstanding Actress in a Drama Series for her role. Any Day Now ended after four seasons and 88 episodes.

From 2002 to 2004, Toussaint had a regular role playing Dr. Elaine Duchamps in the NBC police procedural, Crossing Jordan. In later years, she guest-starred on Frasier, Judging Amy, The Closer, CSI: Crime Scene Investigation, ER, and NCIS. She also was a regular, opposite Holly Hunter,  in the TNT crime drama Saving Grace as Capt. Kate Perry from 2007 to 2010. She had a recurring role as Amelia 'Yoga' Bluman in the ABC comedy series Ugly Betty in 2006, and as Bird Merriweather in the NBC drama Friday Night Lights (2009–11). Toussaint also appeared as Jamie Foxx's character's mother in the 2009 drama The Soloist.

2012–present 

In 2012, Toussaint received critical acclaim and was nominated for an Independent Spirit Award for Best Supporting Female for her performance as a hardworking mother who struggles to support her daughter's (Emayatzy Corinealdi) decision to put her life on hold to support her incarcerated husband (Omari Hardwick), of Middle of Nowhere, a drama film written and directed by Ava DuVernay. Toussaint was a promising contender for an Academy Award for Best Supporting Actress category in 2013, but she did not receive a nomination.

In 2012, she guest-starred in Shonda Rhimes' dramas Grey's Anatomy (as a doctor) and Scandal (as a bereaved and betrayed pastor's wife). In 2013, she had a recurring role in season 3 of Dana Delany's series Body of Proof as villainous police chief Angela Martin. Later in 2013, she joined the cast of ABC Family drama series, The Fosters, as Sherri Saums character’s mother. This marked the first time she reunited on-screen with Annie Potts since the finale of Any Day Now in 2002.

Toussaint starred in the second season of Netflix's original comedy-drama series, Orange Is the New Black in 2014. She played the role of Yvonne "Vee" Parker, the main antagonist of season two, described as a street-tough inmate who returns to jail after a long stint as a drug dealer. Her performance earned critical acclaim. In the series Toussaint, in her 50s, appeared nude on-screen for the first time in her career. For her performance, she won the Critics' Choice Television Award for Best Supporting Actress in a Drama Series and the Screen Actors Guild Award for Outstanding Performance by an Ensemble in a Comedy Series. In February 2016, Vee was ranked 28th on Rolling Stone'''s list of "40 Greatest TV Villains of All Time".

In 2014, Toussaint co-starred in Ava DuVernay's historical drama film Selma, playing Amelia Boynton Robinson, a leading civil rights activist who had a key role in efforts that led to passage of the Voting Rights Act, and who was the first African-American woman in Alabama to run for Congress. That same year, she was cast in the ABC fantasy-drama series Forever opposite Ioan Gruffudd and Alana de la Garza. The series was canceled after a single season. Toussaint co-starred in the comedy film Xmas, directed and written by Jonathan Levine, which was released on November 25, 2015. Also in 2015, she co-starred in Runaway Island and Sophie and the Rising Sun. Later that year, Toussaint was cast in Coco,  a drama produced by Lionsgate, alongside rapper Azealia Banks. In June 2015, she joined the cast of the Fox comedy-drama Rosewood in the series regular role of the titular character's mother.

In March 2016, Toussaint was cast in her role as defense attorney Shambala Green, a role she originated on Law & Order in 1990, on the NBC legal drama Chicago Justice, that aired a backdoor pilot in Chicago P.D.. On August 14, 2017, it was announced that Toussaint would join as a series regular in the third season of Into the Badlands. She played the role of Cressida, a self-styled Prophetess in season 3.

In 2019, Toussaint starred in the NBC limited drama series The Village. The series was canceled after one season. She later starred in the superhero film Fast Color opposite Gugu Mbatha-Raw and played the role of Louise "Lou Lou" Baptiste in the horror film Scary Stories to Tell in the Dark produced by Guillermo del Toro. The following year, she played feminist, civil rights advocate and activist Florynce Kennedy in the biographical film The Glorias directed by Julie Taymor. The film premiered at the Sundance Film Festival on January 26, 2020. Later, she was cast opposite Idris Elba in the drama film Concrete Cowboy. Also in 2020, Toussaint was cast as Viola "Aunt Vi" Lascombe in the CBS reboot for The Equalizer'' starring Queen Latifah.

Personal life 
Toussaint has one daughter named Samara. One of Toussaint's grandparents was from Martinique. She had a blog.

Filmography

Film

Television

Video Games

Awards and nominations

References

External links 

Actresses from New York City
American film actresses
American television actresses
Juilliard School alumni
Living people
20th-century American actresses
21st-century American actresses
People from Brooklyn
Fiorello H. LaGuardia High School alumni
Trinidad and Tobago emigrants to the United States
Trinidad and Tobago film actresses
Trinidad and Tobago producers
Trinidad and Tobago television actresses
Trinidad and Tobago people of Martiniquais descent
American people of Martiniquais descent
Year of birth missing (living people)